Stomatella striatula is a species of sea snail, a marine gastropod mollusk in the family Trochidae, the top snails.

Description
The ovate-oblong shell is very elongated and shaped like Haliotis. It is slightly convex, and strongly striated all over the rather flat back. The striae are deep and rather wide apart. Its color is red varied with orange, light yellow and brown. The prominent spire is elevated and often distorted. The outer lip is very flexuous.

Distribution
This marine species occurs off Australia and the Philippines.

References

  Proceedings of the Zoological Society of London. pt. 18–19 (1850–1851)

striatula
Gastropods described in 1850